House on the Rock is a Christian Church headquartered in Lagos, Nigeria. House on the Rock was founded by Paul Adefarasin in 1994, It is well known for its annual musical concert, The Experience (World's Largest Gospel Concert), which features both local and international gospel musicians.

When Adefarasin returned to Nigeria in 1994, he decided to start a Christian church (House On The Rock) from his mother's living room in Lagos. This same ministry has expanded to over 50 branches worldwide, mostly in Nigeria, with several provinces in South Africa, the Democratic Republic of the Congo, Ireland, and the United Kingdom.

The Rock Cathedral 
The Rock Cathedral (also known as the Millennium Temple) is located in Ikate-Elegushi, Lekki, Lagos and houses the global headquarters of House On The Rock and The Rock Foundation. Construction of the facility started in 2003, and now accommodates installations for religious and social functions, including worship, education, healthcare, community development, reformation training, recreation and social rehabilitation. Paul Adefarasin has been quoted saying that the idea behind the cathedral is to provide a "one-stop centre for Christians looking for materials and goods of every kind."

The official commissioning of The Rock Cathedral took place on 20 April 2013, with prominent personalities in attendance, including Goodluck Jonathan and Tony Blair.

The Rock Foundation 
The Rock Foundation is a non-profit charity organisation that provides health care, education, social reformation, and relief materials to the needy. The foundation operates primarily in Nigeria and the West Africa region. Paul Adefarasin serves as the Founder and President of the foundation.

Project Spread 
Project Spread is an end-of-year empowerment programme by the Rock Foundation that sees the distribution of food, medicine and other supplies to residents in needy communities.

In December 2017, Paul Adefarasin led a team of about 20,000 participants to the Lagos Island, Ikate-Elegushi, Ebute-Meta and Bariga communities in Lagos to launch the year's initiative. Adefarasin mentioned during the Lagos Island phase of the Project Spread that he decided to begin the initiative from Lagos Island because he was born within the community.

Notable Events

The Experience 
The Experience is an annual free musical concert held in Lagos involving various renowned gospel musicians from Nigeria and around the world attending. The event started in 2006 and is hosted by Paul Adefarasin every year at the Tafawa Balewa Square on Lagos Island.

Gospel musicians such as Travis Greene,  Kirk Franklin, CeCe Winans, Donnie McClurkin, Don Moen, Frank Edwards (gospel musician), Nathaniel Bassey, and Chioma Jesus have previously headlined the concert.

References

External links 

 

Churches in Lagos
1994 establishments in Nigeria